Bob Jenks may refer to:

 Bobby Jenks (born 1981), American baseball pitcher
 Bob Jencks (1941–2010), American football kicker